Syafiqa Haidar Afif Abdul Rahman (born 24 January 1994) is a Malaysian international lawn bowler. She is a Southeast Asian Games gold medalist and has represented Malaysia at the Commonwealth Games winning a silver medal.

Biography
She has won the gold medal at the Lawn bowls at the Southeast Asian Games, in 2019 in the fours event.

In 2022, she was selected for the 2022 Commonwealth Games in Birmingham, where she competed in the men's pairs triples and the women's fours event. In the triples, the team of Abdul Rahman, Nur Ain Nabilah Tarmizi and Azlina Arshad secured a silver medal but lost the final to England.

In 2023, she won the triples gold medals at the 14th Asian Lawn Bowls Championship in Kuala Lumpur.

References

1994 births
Living people
Malaysian female bowls players
Bowls players at the 2022 Commonwealth Games
Commonwealth Games competitors for Malaysia
Commonwealth Games medallists in lawn bowls
Commonwealth Games silver medallists for Malaysia
Competitors at the 2019 Southeast Asian Games
Southeast Asian Games medalists in lawn bowls
Southeast Asian Games gold medalists for Malaysia
21st-century Malaysian women
Medallists at the 2022 Commonwealth Games